Gajabahu II was king of Rajarata from 1131 until 1153, following his father Vikramabahu I.  He was defeated and succeeded by Parakramabahu I.

See also
 Mahavamsa
 List of monarchs of Sri Lanka
 History of Sri Lanka

References

External links
 Kings & Rulers of Sri Lanka
 Codrington's Short History of Ceylon

Monarchs of Polonnaruwa
G
G
G